Titan FC 27: Ricci vs. Gurgel  was a mixed martial arts event, held on February 28, 2014 at the Memorial Hall in Kansas City, Kansas.

Official fight card

See also
Titan Fighting Championships
List of Titan FC events
Titan FC events

References

2014 in mixed martial arts
Mixed martial arts in Kansas
Sports in Kansas
2014 in sports in  Kansas
February 2014 sports events in the United States